This article lists notable faculty of the University of Hawaii. Faculty who are also alumni are listed in bold font, with degree and year in parentheses.

See also
List of University of Hawaii alumni

Footnotes

Faculty
Hawaii